Abdul Aziz Adbullah Ali Al Suadi is a Yemeni citizen who was held in extrajudicial detention in the United States Guantánamo Bay detainment camps, in Cuba, from May 3, 2002, to January 21, 2016.
His Guantanamo Internment Serial Number is 578.
The Department of Defense reports that Al Suadi was born on  June 16, 1974, in Milhan, Yemen.

He was the first captive to be sent to Montenegro.
According to his lawyer David Remes, al-Suadi was one of the most westernized captives in Guantanamo.  He mastered English there, and was getting high marks in the college courses in Mathematics he was taking by correspondence.

Inconsistent identification

Al Suadi's name was spelled inconsistently on the official documents the DoD has released. 
His name was spelled as Abdul Aziz Abdullah Ali Al Suadi on the official lists released on April 20, 2006, and May 15, 2006.
His name was spelled as Abdulaziz Adbullah Ali Al Suadi on the first page of the unclassified dossier released to the Associated Press in early 2005.
His name was spelled as Abdul Aziz Alsuwedy on the Summary of Evidence memo prepared for his second annual Administrative Review Board in 2006.

Official status reviews

Originally the Bush Presidency asserted that captives apprehended in the "war on terror" were not covered by the Geneva Conventions, and could be held indefinitely, without charge, and without an open and transparent review of the justifications for their detention.
In 2004, the United States Supreme Court ruled, in Rasul v. Bush, that Guantanamo captives were entitled to being informed of the allegations justifying their detention, and were entitled to try to refute them.

Following the Supreme Court's ruling the Department of Defense set up the Office for the Administrative Review of Detained Enemy Combatants.

Scholars at the Brookings Institution, led by Benjamin Wittes, listed the captives still
held in Guantanamo in December 2008, according to whether their detention was justified by certain
common allegations:

 Abdul Aziz Abdullah Ali Al Suadi  was listed as one of the captives who "The military alleges ... are members of Al Qaeda."
 Abdul Aziz Abdullah Ali Al Suadi  was listed as one of the captives who "The military alleges ... traveled to Afghanistan for jihad."
 Abdul Aziz Abdullah Ali Al Suadi  was listed as one of the captives who "The military alleges that the following detainees stayed in Al Qaeda, Taliban or other guest- or safehouses."
 Abdul Aziz Abdullah Ali Al Suadi  was listed as one of the captives who "The military alleges ... took military or terrorist training in Afghanistan."
 Abdul Aziz Abdullah Ali Al Suadi  was listed as one of the captives who "The military alleges that the following detainees were captured under circumstances that strongly suggest belligerency."
 Abdul Aziz Abdullah Ali Al Suadi  was listed as one of the captives who was a foreign fighter.
 Abdul Aziz Abdullah Ali Al Suadi  was listed as one of the captives who "say that they were doing charity work."

Although Al Suadi didn't attend his 2004 Combatant Status Review Tribunal, the brief handwritten notes his Personal Representative prepared were part of his dossier:

Al Suadi chose to participate in his 2005 Administrative Review Board hearing.
In early 2006, in response to a court order from Jed Rakoff the Department of Defense published a fifteen-page summarized transcript from his 2005 hearing.

A two-page Summary of Evidence memo was prepared for his
second annual Administrative Review Board hearing.

Al Suadi said he would not attend his 2006 administrative review, unless he could hear and respond to the classified evidence against him.
He drafted a statement to be read instead.

A three-page Summary of Evidence memo was prepared for his
third annual Administrative Review Board hearing.

Habeas corpus
A writ of habeas corpus, Abdul Aziz Abdullah Ali Al Suadi v. United States, was submitted on Abdul Aziz Abdullah Ali Al Suadi's behalf.

In response, on October 1, 2004, the Department of Defense released 16 pages of unclassified documents related to his Combatant Status Review Tribunal.

Abdul Aziz Abdullah Ali Al Suadi's enemy combatant status was confirmed by 
Tribunal panel 5.

Recorder Exhibit List
Abdul Aziz Abdullah Ali Al Suadi's dossier contained a Recorder Exhibit List

Formerly secret Joint Task Force Guantanamo assessment

On April 25, 2011, whistleblower organization WikiLeaks published formerly secret assessments drafted by Joint Task Force Guantanamo analysts.
His ten-page Joint Task Force Guantanamo assessment was drafted on June 9, 2008.
It was signed by camp commandant Rear Admiral David M. Thomas Jr.
He recommended continued detention.

Further reading

References

External links

Abdul Aziz Adbullah Ali Al Suadi
Yemeni extrajudicial prisoners of the United States
Living people
1974 births